Alun Lewis (born 15 January 1956) is a former Welsh rugby union player. He joined the 1977 British Lions tour to New Zealand as a replacement during the tour. He represented Cambridge University R.U.F.C. in the Varsity Match in 1975 and 1976 and played club rugby for Bedford in 1974-5 before joining London Welsh RFC. However, he never played international rugby for Wales.

References

External links
Lions profile

1956 births
Living people
Bedford Blues players
British & Irish Lions rugby union players from Wales
Cambridge University R.U.F.C. players
London Welsh RFC players
Rugby union players from Blackwood, Caerphilly
Rugby union players from Caerphilly County Borough
Welsh rugby union players
Rugby union scrum-halves